The softy hap (Mylochromis mollis) is a species of cichlid endemic to Lake Malawi.  This species can reach a length of  TL.  This species can also be found in the aquarium trade.

References

Softy hap
Fish described in 1935
Taxonomy articles created by Polbot